Longford Greyhound Stadium is a greyhound racing track located on the south side of Longford, County Longford, Ireland.

The stadium is a ten-minute walk from the town centre and has a large customer car park. Racing takes place every Monday and Friday evening and the facilities include a fast food bar and totalisator betting.

Race distances are 525, 550, 750 and 805 yards.

History
Longford Greyhound Stadium is accessed via Earl Street and is just about the most centrally located track you can get in Ireland. The south Longford venue has a circumference of 485 yards and opened in May 1939. The track hosts the Longford Derby & Longford Puppy Derby and other events to have taken place previously here are the Padian Cup and Smithwicks 550.

One of the pioneers of the track was M. J. Lyons (a local businessman), and John Dorris (managing director) and Jim Conroy (former racing manager) have been long service personnel at the track.

In 1966 the track closed for the winter break and looked unlikely to re-open, but the owner Thomas Packenham sold the site to Longford Sports Ltd.

The small track remains a tight circuit and in recent times has battled for survival during a hard financial climate. The management including current Racing Manager Patrick Farrington and the voluntary committee continues to work hard to achieve a safe surface and environment for the greyhounds to run in. In July 2014 the sale of the Park Road track was agreed to Scottish-based greyhound owner Howard Wallace.

Competitions
Longford Derby
Longford Puppy Derby

Track records
Current

Former

References

External links
Irish Greyhound Board

Greyhound racing venues in the Republic of Ireland